Sam Hubbard (born June 29, 1995) is an American football defensive end for the Cincinnati Bengals of the National Football League (NFL). He played college football at Ohio State, and was drafted by the Bengals in the third round of the 2018 NFL Draft.

Early years
Hubbard attended Archbishop Moeller High School in Cincinnati, Ohio. Hubbard played the position of Safety in high school, and as a senior, had 109 tackles and five interceptions. He was rated as a five-star recruit by Scout.com and committed to Ohio State University to play college football. Hubbard also played lacrosse in high school, and was at one time committed to the University of Notre Dame to play college lacrosse.

College career
Hubbard redshirted his first year at Ohio State in 2014. As a redshirt freshman in 2015, he played in all 13 games and had 28 tackles and 6.5 sacks. As a redshirt sophomore in 2016, he started all 13 games and had 46 tackles and 3.5 sacks. Hubbard played in 14 games in 2017 as a redshirt junior and had 42 tackles along with a career high seven sacks. Hubbard declared for the 2018 NFL Draft on December 30, 2017.

Professional career
On December 30, 2017, Hubbard released a statement on Twitter announcing his decision to enter the 2018 NFL Draft. He attended the NFL Scouting Combine in Indianapolis and completed the majority of combine drills, but opted to skip the 40-yard dash and bench press. Hubbard participated in linebacker and defensive end drills at the combine. On March 22, 2018, he participated at Ohio State's pro day and performed positional drills, the 40-yard dash, 20-yard dash, and 10-yard dash. At the conclusion of the pre-draft process, Hubbard was projected to be a first or second round pick by NFL draft experts and scouts. He was ranked the third best defensive end in the draft by DraftScout.com, was ranked the fourth best defensive end by Scouts Inc., and was also ranked the fifth best edge rusher in the draft by Sports Illustrated.

2018
The Cincinnati Bengals selected Hubbard in the third round with the 77th overall pick in the 2018 NFL Draft. Hubbard was the seventh defensive end drafted in 2018.

On June 21, 2018, the Cincinnati Bengals signed Hubbard to a four-year, $3.61 million contract that includes a signing bonus of $929,200.

On September 13, Hubbard recorded his first-career sack against the Baltimore Ravens, bringing down Joe Flacco for a loss of 11 yards in the 34–23 victory. In a Week 5 victory over the Miami Dolphins, he recorded a 19-yard fumble recovery for a touchdown. As a rookie, he totaled 39 total tackles, nine quarterback hits, seven tackles-for-loss, two passes defensed, one forced fumble, and one fumble recovery.

2019
In the Bengals' 2019 regular season opener, Hubbard recorded two sacks and a career-best 10 tackles in the 21–20 loss to the Seattle Seahawks.
In Week 5 against the Arizona Cardinals, Hubbard sacked rookie quarterback Kyler Murray once in the 26–23 loss.
In Week 17 against the Cleveland Browns, Hubbard recorded a team high six tackles and sacked Baker Mayfield 1.5 times during the 33–23 win.

2020
In Week 3 against the Philadelphia Eagles, Hubbard recorded his first sack of the season on Carson Wentz during the 23–23 tie game.  He suffered an elbow injury in Week 5 and was placed on injured reserve on October 15, 2020. He was activated on November 14, 2020.

2021
On July 25, 2021, Hubbard signed a four-year, $40 million contract extension with the Bengals. Hubbard had a 2.5-sack game against the Baltimore Ravens in Week 7, a 41–17 victory. In the 4th Quarter of the 2021 AFC Championship game against the Kansas City Chiefs, Hubbard strip sacked Patrick Mahomes in the red zone which forced the Chiefs to kick a field goal to tie the game and send the Bengals into overtime in the eventual 27–24 win.

2022
On January 15, 2023, in the Wild Card Game against the Baltimore Ravens, Hubbard scored a 98-yard touchdown in the 4th quarter off of a fumble by Tyler Huntley. This was the longest fumble return in NFL postseason history and has since been deemed the “Fumble in the Jungle.” The play proved to be the deciding factor in the game, as the Bengals went on to win 24–17.

Personal life
In 2021, Hubbard incorporated the Sam Hubbard Foundation. In recognition of his support for his community the Bengals selected him as their nominee for the Walter Payton NFL Man of the Year Award in 2021 and 2022.

References

External links
Cincinnati Bengals bio
Sam Hubbard Foundation
Ohio State Buckeyes bio

1995 births
Living people
Players of American football from Cincinnati
American football defensive ends
Ohio State Buckeyes football players
Cincinnati Bengals players